October is a contemporary piece for concert band that was written by Eric Whitacre in 2000.  Based on the guidelines as established by the authors of Teaching Music through Performance in Band, October is a Grade 5 piece.

Background
Eric Whitacre composed October with the intention of evoking a peaceful musical representation of the month he has called his favorite, and the feelings this month evokes for him.  Whitacre writes in a programme note: 

October was premiered on May 14, 2000, by the Nebraska Wind Consortium, a band composed of students from 30 Nebraska high school bands. It is dedicated to Brian Anderson, the organizer of the consortium.

Grading difficulty

Rhythm and metric complexity
While common time is the primary meter, many sections stay in the same metre for as little as one measure. This switching between metres is less difficult than it might be, because the division of the beat remains the same.

Most of the rhythmic patterns used in October are manageable for high school students. For the most part, the piece uses simple divisions of duple rhythms, ranging from whole notes to eighth notes. The last of these, the eighth note, dominates the first half of the piece, occurring in at least one instrument in every measure. In the second half of the piece, quarter and half notes dominate, and there is a quarter-note triplet in one measure. One particularly difficult measure toward the end of the piece has a beat incorporating a complex cross-rhythm: the low brass and low woodwinds play an eighth-note triplet with sixteenth notes on the last beat; the 3rd B clarinets play four sixteenth notes; the 2nd B clarinets play five sixteenth notes; the oboes play six sixteenth notes; and the 1st B clarinets, the E clarinet and the flutes play seven sixteenth notes.

Instrumentation
The instrumentation of October is standard for most high school concert bands. There are thirty-three different parts. Players can double up for the two flute parts, the three clarinet parts and the saxophone and trumpet parts. The oboe, E clarinet, bass clarinet, bassoon, horn, trombone, euphonium and tuba parts will probably each be played by just one performer. The band should be about sixty-five members strong or a little more. This is a practical number for a high school band, although it will depend on the school district. With sixty-five players, some of them will be the only performer of their particular part.  Two of the instruments that Whitacre used, the E clarinet and the bass trombone, are high school instruments, not middle school.

Instrument ranges
In the table, pitches are the written pitches, not the sounding pitches.

Scoring and texture
October requires a substantial amount of playing from each section of the band and has many tuttis, giving students practice in blending with other instruments and in matching the timbre across the ensemble. October switches frequently between thin and thick textures. The most usual pattern is for a small group of woodwinds to play, then the whole ensemble, and then a small group of woodwinds once more. This progression will create the serene and expressive mood that Whitacre aims for and will allow individuals, as well as the ensemble, to play with emotion.

Technical facility
The technical problems presented by October are not so much those of rhythm and speed as those that arise from the different keys, the key relationships, and the pianistic melodic line. Whitacre uses four main key signatures: D-flat major, A-flat major, B-flat major and G major.

Form and structure
October has an introduction, four main themes, a short interlude and a final coda. A new theme is heard in measures 19–30: the woodwinds continue to play, and the texture builds up progressively as the brass instruments enter. After the second theme, the first theme returns briefly, this time in tutti. The clarinets and horns play an alternating rhythm, and the bassoon and the trombone create a hocket as they play the transition to the next section. The third theme, in A♭ major, is heard in measures 40–65, beginning with a passage for solo euphonium accompanied by clarinets playing tremolo, muted trumpets and stopped horns. The section grows as more instruments enter, and the phrase reaches its climax with a metric modulation. Theme three is followed by a four-bar interlude in which the oboe solo that began the piece is heard once more, but this time in B♭ major. Measures 72–89 present the fourth and final theme in the key of G major, again with the upper woodwinds playing first and then growing until all the instruments have entered. The first theme returns in measures 73–97, played by the entire ensemble. The piece concludes with a coda from measure 98 to the end (m. 113). A six-measure melodic hocket is played by the horn, trombone, euphonium and trumpets, ending with a climax in G major. October concludes with the low brass and woodwinds playing a long diminuendo into silence.

Melodic material
October begins with the solo oboe playing an introductory melody (I) in D♭ major, consisting of eighth and quarter notes embellished by grace notes. The next melody, played by all the upper woodwinds, the tenor saxophone and the horns (II), uses a variety of intervals – fourths, fifths, sevenths and an octave – making it somewhat angular. The melody of theme two, played by the upper woodwinds, also uses eighth and quarter notes (III). The motion of this melody is more stepwise than the previous one. The next new melody, for solo euphonium, mixes many leaps with stepwise motion and repeated notes (IV). The melody of the interlude is a restatement of the opening melody in a different key. The final theme presents a new melody played by the flutes, clarinets and alto saxophones; it is rhythmically simpler than previous material (V). The melody in the coda is distributed among the saxophones, trombones, euphonium, and trumpet (VI).

Harmonic material
The piece begins in D♭ major with a single held note in the 1st clarinets and gentle wind chimes underneath. The remaining clarinets join the chimes to support the oboe melody. Proceeding to the first theme, the texture becomes thicker, and the bass clarinet, bassoons, euphoniums and tubas now play the accompaniment. In theme two, the whole brass section accompanies the melody of the upper woodwinds. In the transition to theme three, the bassoons play a harmony that sets up a modulation to A♭ major. In this new key and new theme, the accompaniment returns to the clarinets, which play trills. The effect depends not so much on the notes as on the contrast between the sonority of the trills and the euphonium solo. The music modulates to B♭ major, and the bassoons, euphoniums and tubas play harmonic ostinatos. All of the brass play the harmony during the fourth theme, now in G Major. In the coda, all the woodwinds play trills above the melodic brass. The piece concludes with the brass quietly playing a final G major chord.

Form and structure chart

References

Further reading
Brookhart, Susan M. Grading, 2nd ed. New York: Merrill, 2009.

Compositions by Eric Whitacre
Contemporary classical compositions
2000 compositions
Concert band pieces